Cyclopenthiazide (trade name Navidrex) is a thiazide diuretic used in the treatment of heart failure and hypertension.

Synthesis

Contraindications

Thiazide diuretics increase the excretion of sodium and potassium ions and decrease the excretion of calcium ions and uric acid so they are contraindicated in patients with hyponatraemia, hypokalaemia, hypercalcaemia and hyperuricaemia. They are also contraindicated in patients with Addison's disease.

See also
Cyclothiazide
Hydrochlorothiazide
Bendroflumethiazide

References

Diuretics
Sulfonamides
Benzothiadiazines
Chloroarenes